Silvia Farina Elia was the two-time defending champion, and successfully defended her title, defeating Karolina Šprem in the final, 6–3, 4–6, 6–4.

Seeds

Draw

Finals

Top half

Bottom half

External links
Draws (ITF) 

2003 Internationaux de Strasbourg Singles
2003 WTA Tour
2003 in French tennis